Marie-Luise Scherer (15 October 1938 – 17 December 2022) was a German writer and journalist.

Biography
Scherer began her career as a reporter for the Kölner Stadt-Anzeiger and later wrote for Berliner Morgenpost and Die Zeit. She was a journalist at Der Spiegel from 1974 to 1998, where she became known for her literary reports. More recently, she wrote autobiographical pieces for Sinn und Form, a bimonthly literature journal of the Academy of Arts, Berlin.

In her writing, Scherer wrote a form she characterized as "syllable work", explaining that "two good sentences in one day are lucky". For more than 20 years, she wrote a maximum of two reports a year for Der Spiegel.

Her works have been translated into French, Italian, and Spanish. She lived in Damnatz and died on 17 December 2022, at the age of 84.

Awards
Theodor Wolff Prize (1970)
Egon Erwin Kisch Prize for Der Zustand, eine hilflose Person zu sein (1977)
Egon Erwin Kisch Prize for Auf deutsch gesagt: gestrauchelt (1979)
 (1989)
Ludwig Börne Prize (1994)
Italo-Svevo-Preis (2008)
Heinrich Mann Prize (2011)
Kunstpreis des Saarlandes (2012)
 (with Stefan Chwin, 2015)

Works
Ungeheurer Alltag. Geschichten und Reportagen (1988)
Der Akkordeonspieler. Wahre Geschichten aus vier Jahrzehnten (2004)
Die Bestie von Paris und andere Geschichten (2012)
Die Hundegrenze (2013)
Unter jeder Lampe gab es Tanz (2014)
Der Akkordeonspieler (2017)

References

1938 births
2022 deaths
20th-century German writers
21st-century German writers
20th-century German journalists
Der Spiegel people
Members of the Academy of Arts, Berlin
Heinrich Mann Prize winners
People from Saarbrücken